Elita 5 is an Albanian rock band formed in Tetovë in 1988. The group consisted of vocalist Arif Ziberi, guitarist Mevaip Mustafi, drummer Besim Ibraimi, bass player Agron Idrizi and keyboardist Nexhat Mujovi. With a heavy rock sound and Albanian influence, the band is considered a pioneer of Albanian rock and their songs have a very large fanbase in Albania. It is one of the bands that marked and indicated the path of Albanian rock music in the post-communism period.

Career
The band formed in 1988 in the town of Tetovo, SR Macedonia, although their first recording was published as an album titled Elita 5 in 1990.

They have repeatedly refused to play in competitive festivals stating that "the band does not belong in festivals", preferring concerts instead.
  
In a 2001 concert, the band had opened in Tirana, Albania for the German heavy metal band Scorpions, the vocalist Arif Ziberi in an interview noted that this was one of the most exciting moments in his life.

In 2008 the band organised a humanitarian concert in Tetovo, Macedonia for the victims of the 2008 Gërdec explosions.

They take part in many concerts and are annually invited to close the Beer fest in the city of Korçë, Albania.

Members
Mevaip Mustafi (Guitar) 
Besim Ibraimi (Drums)  
Arif Ziberi (Vocals) 
Agron Idrizi (Bass guitar)  
Nexhat Mujovi - Wirusi (Keyboards).
Valon Gashi (Lead guitar)

Discography

Albums

 Elita 5 (1990)
 Nuk jam Al Kapone (1992)
 Fol, vetëm fol (1994)
 Si Merlin Monro (1997)
 Hitet e Elita 5 (1998)
 Only for You (Vetem per ju) (2000)
 Elita 5 Live (2000) (LP)
 Bardh e zi (2004)
 The Best Of Elita 5 (2005)
 Çmendem (2007)
 Mohikani I Fundit (2014)

Awards and nominations

Netet e Klipit Shqiptar

|-
||2012
||"Nuk jam une diktator"
|Jury Prize
|
|-
||2013
||"Degjo"
|Best Rock Video
|
|-
||2015
||"Me fal"
|Best Director
|
|}

Video Fest Awards

|-
|rowspan="2"|2005
|rowspan="2"|"Faleminderit"
|Best Promotion Video
|
|-
|Best Rock Video
|
|}

Zhurma Show Awards

|-
|rowspan="5"|2005
|rowspan="5"|"Faleminderit"
|Best Rock
|
|-
|Best Editing
|
|-
|Top List
|
|-
|Best Video/First Prize 
|
|-
|Best Album
|
|-
||2012
||"Degjo"
|Best Rock
|
|-
|rowspan="2"|2014
|rowspan="2"|"Me fal"
|Best Video/First Prize
|
|-
|Best Rock
|
|-
||2014
||"Mohikani i fundit "
|Best Album
|
|}

References

Macedonian rock music groups
Albanian rock music groups
Albanian musicians from North Macedonia